Events from the year 1849 in Sweden

Incumbents
 Monarch – Oscar I

Events

 11 May - Uppsala Student Union
 Fredrika Bremer travels to USA.
 The Bourse (Gothenburg) is opened. 
 The second of the von Schwerin Estate's Scandals attracts attention. 
 The Nya smedjegården in Stockholm is transformed to a women's prison.

Births
 
 13 January - Alfhild Agrell,  writer and playwright (died 1923) 
 22 January – August Strindberg, writer and playwright (died 1912) 
 14 December - Wilhelmina Skogh, business person (died 1926) 
 25 May - Louise Hammarström, chemist (died 1917) 
 31 May -  Carl Fredrik Hill, painter (died 1911) 
 22 September – Olena Falkman, concert vocalist (died 1928) 
 1 October – Anne Charlotte Leffler,  writer and playwright (died 1892) 
 7 October - Martina Bergman-Österberg, physical education instructor and women's suffrage advocate (died 1915)
 17 October – Johan Ericson  
 6 December – Maria Adelborg 
 11 December – Ellen Key, writer (died 1926) 
 31 December – Birger Eek
 Louise von Fersen, courtier  (born 1777)

Deaths

References

 
Years of the 19th century in Sweden
Sweden